Bernard J. Durkan (born 26 March 1945) is an Irish Fine Gael politician who has been a Teachta Dála (TD) for the Kildare North constituency since 1997, and previously from 1982 to 1997 and 1981 to 1982 for the Kildare constituency. He previously served as Minister of State for Social Welfare from 1994 to 1997. He was a Senator for the Agricultural Panel from May 1982 to November 1982.

He was born in Killasser, Swinford, County Mayo, in 1945. Durkan was educated at St. John's, Carramore, County Mayo.

He was elected to Kildare County Council in 1976 and was a member until 1994, serving as chairman from 1986 to 1987. He was elected to Dáil Éireann for the Kildare constituency at the 1981 general election, but lost his seat at the February 1982 general election following the defeat of the Fine Gael–Labour Party coalition. He was then subsequently elected as a member of the 16th Seanad as a Senator for the Agricultural Panel.

Durkan regained his Dáil seat at the November 1982 general election, and was re-elected at the 1987, 1989, and 1992 general elections. When the Kildare constituency was divided, he was elected at the 1997 general election for the new constituency of Kildare North, and retained his seat at the 2002 and 2007 general elections. He also topped the poll in the 2011 general election. He was re-elected at the 2016 general election and 2020 general election, retaining his seat on both occasions on the final count.

During his career as a member of Dáil Éireann, he has held several Front Bench portfolios in Fine Gael, including Health, Food, Trade and Industry, Insurance, Overseas Development Aid and Human Rights, and Communications and Natural Resources. He served as Minister of State for Social Welfare from 1994 to 1997.

He currently serves as Vice-Chairman of the Joint Oireachtas on Committee on Foreign Affairs and Trade and as a member of the Joint Committee on European Affairs. He has also previously acted as the chairman on the Oireachtas Committee of European Affairs and a member of the Eastern Health Board. He has also served as Fine Gael Chief Whip. In 2010, Durkan refused to defer the drawing of his ministerial pension while still being paid as a TD. He instead decided to donate this pension to charity.

References

External links
Bernard Durkan's page on the Fine Gael website

1945 births
Living people
Fine Gael TDs
Irish farmers
Local councillors in County Kildare
Members of the 22nd Dáil
Members of the 16th Seanad
Members of the 24th Dáil
Members of the 25th Dáil
Members of the 26th Dáil
Members of the 27th Dáil
Members of the 28th Dáil
Members of the 29th Dáil
Members of the 30th Dáil
Members of the 31st Dáil
Members of the 32nd Dáil
Members of the 33rd Dáil
Ministers of State of the 27th Dáil
Politicians from County Mayo
Fine Gael senators
People from Swinford, County Mayo